The 2022–23 Delhi Premier League was the first season of DPL as a top-tier football league under the Delhi Football League. The season started on July 15, 2022, and ended on September 29, 2022.

Delhi FC were the defending champions. Matches were played in Ambedkar Stadium and Jawaharlal Nehru Stadium in Delhi. Debutants Vatika FC were the winners of the league title and earned qualification to 2023–24 I-League 2nd Division.

Changes in format
Delhi Premier League, which acted as a final round in the previous edition broke away from the FD Senior Division league to became the top tier league in Delhi, while the former became a second tier league.

A total of ten clubs from the previous edition were joined by Vatika FC who were the league's first entrants through bidding.

For the first time ever, the teams played double round robin matches thereby increasing the number of games to 110 with 20 matches per side.

Teams
Eleven teams competed in the first edition of Delhi Premier League.

Standings

Awards 
Ajay Singh of Friends United FC won the Player of the tournament award for scoring 24 goals in 20 games.

See also
2022–23 Indian State Leagues

References

Football in Delhi
3
2022–23 in Indian football